The Collegium Russicum is a Catholic college in Rome dedicated to studies of the culture and spirituality of Russia.

It is located near the Basilica di Santa Maria Maggiore, separated from the Pontifical Oriental Institute by the Church of Saint Anthony, and is known informally as the Russicum.

History
The college is built on the site of what was once a hospital, created by bequest in 1529, by Cardinal Pietro Capocci. From the middle of the 18th century the hospital was assigned to Camaldolese nuns, who kept it until it was confiscated by the government in 1871. In 1928 the church of Sant'Antonio Abate all'Esquilino and its surroundings were acquired by the Holy See, which assigned the church to Russian Catholics of the Byzantine Rite and the surrounding buildings to the Collegium Russicum.

The Russicum, which was founded on August 15, 1929 by Pope Pius XI, was intended to train Russian Greek Catholic priests to serve as missionaries in the growing Russian diaspora of anti-communist political refugees, and despite the anti-religious persecution taking place in the Soviet Union, in that very country. The money for both the college building and its reconstruction were taken from an aggregate of charity donations from faithful all over the world on the occasion of the canonization of St. Thérèse de Lisieux, placing the Russicum under her patronage.

The Collegium Russicum is run by the Society of Jesus and provides education and accommodation for Catholic and Orthodox students.

Rectors
1. Vendelín Javorka, S.J. (1929-1936), Slovak
2. Philippe de Régis, S.J. (1936-1942), French
3. Francisco Echarri, S.J. (1942-1946), Spanish-Basque, Vice-Rector 
4. Philippe de Régis, S.J. (1946-1948), French
5. Gustav Andrej Wetter, S.J. (1948-1955), Austrian
6. Bohumíl-Feofil Horáček, S.J. (1955-1962), Czech
7. Josef Olšar, S.J. (1962-1967), Czech
8. Paul Mailleux, S.J. (1967-1978), Belgian
9. Gino-Kirill Piovesan, S.J. (1978-1985), Italian
10. Josef Macha, S.J. (1985-1991), German
11. John Long, S.J. (1991-1996), American
12. Richard Čemus, S.J. (1996-2001), Czech
13. Alojzij Cvikl, S.J. (2001-2010), Slovene
14. Lionginas Virbalas, S.J. (2010-2013), Lithuanian
15. Anto Lozuk, S.J. (2013-2017), Croat
16. Peter Dufka, S.J. (2017-2019), Slovak, Vice-Rector
17. Tomás García-Huidobro Rivas, S.J. (2019-), Chilean

Notable alumni
 
Walter Ciszek, S.J. (1904-1984) — American priest of the Russian Greek Catholic Church, GULAG survivor, author of With God in Russia.
Ján Kellner (1912-1941) — Slovak priest, missionary to USSR, executed in Kiev in 1941.
Pietro Leoni (1909-1995) — Italian priest of the Russian Greek Catholic Church, survivor of the GULAG, author of Spio dei Vaticano.
Blessed Theodore Romzha (1911-1947) — Ruthenian Greek Catholic Church Bishop of the Byzantine Catholic Eparchy of Mukacheve, martyr under Joseph Stalin.
Egon Sendler, S.J. (1923-2014) — French priest.

Notable faculty
Vyacheslav Ivanov (1866-1949), Russian Symbolist poet, convert to the Russian Greek Catholic Church, and Russicum professor of Old Church Slavonic, the traditional liturgical language used by all Byzantine Rite Churches in Eastern Europe.

See also
 List of Jesuit sites

References

Sources
 Russicum: Pioneers and Witnesses of the Struggle for Christian Unity in Eastern Europe (review) The Catholic Historical Review - Volume 93, Number 3, July 2007, pp. 694–696

External links
The Russian College in Rome
 Greetings of Card. Tarcisio Bertone on the occasion of the Feast of Saint Thérèse of the Child Jesus at the Russicum Pontifical College (May 15, 2008) in Italian
Document about missionaries to USSR during WWII educated in Collegium Russicum
Momenti del rituale greco-bizantino al Pontificio Collegio Russicum

1929 establishments in Italy
Educational institutions established in 1929
Catholic universities and colleges in Italy
Properties of the Holy See